Diva Starz was a series of talking fashion dolls created and released by Mattel in October 2000. They are similar in design to MGA's Bratz and Tiger Electronics' Furby. Alexa, Nikki, Summer—later replaced by Miranda—and Tia were offered in the original debut. Originally produced as robotic dolls, Mattel would also release miniature and fashion doll versions in response to their initial success. The line was discontinued in 2004.

History
Invented by toy designer Robert Jeffway Jr. and launched by Mattel in October 2000, Diva Starz were released in response to the virtual pet craze, which peaked in the late '90s thanks to successful interactive toys such as Furby and Tamagotchi. The brand initially featured four characters: Alexa, Nikki, Summer, and Tia, who each had diverse ethnicities and personalities. The owner could change the doll's outfits by snapping on different pieces of clothing. By using small metal sensors in the clothing and on the body, the doll "knows" which outfit it is wearing and will respond accordingly. Alexa, for example, replies with statements like "You have a great sense of style. I love my pink evening gown. Do you think it makes my eyes look bluer?". This is also the case with the doll's accessories, which usually include items such as a cell phone, CD player, laptop, diary, and pet. These also utilized small metal sensors and were meant to be placed on the doll's hand. Along with this, the dolls also used an infrared (IR) sensor, which was implemented in the dolls' shoes so that they could communicate with each other and carry on conversations. Each doll took 4 AA alkaline batteries.

Contrary to Mattel's expectations, the dolls would end up becoming a surprise hit for the company and were popular amongst tween girls, between the ages of 6 and 11, even being named "the product of the year for girls". Despite this, they did generate some criticism, particularly from parents. Some were concerned that the dolls' stylized proportions could inspire future cases of anorexia, while others took issue with the marketing, labeling it "tacky" and "stereotypical". Regardless, the dolls were successful enough to be distributed in other markets, such as Europe, and South America.

After the huge success of the original dolls, Mattel released miniature versions of the dolls called "Mini Diva Starz" in 2001. They would talk when a button was pressed on the top of their heads and would say about 4 different pre-recorded phrases. They had non-removable clothes and were poseable. They also came with hair accessories made out of real fabric, such as hats and headbands. Accessories for these dolls would usually include hair clips, sunglasses, and a purse. These dolls took 3 LR44 button-cell alkaline batteries. Mattel would also release the second wave of main Diva Starz dolls in 2001, along with plush versions of the dolls and their pets.

Beginning in 2002, the dolls' popularity would start to decline, largely due to the success of Mattel's rival, MGA Entertainment's Bratz dolls, which were released in May 2001. In response to this, Mattel launched "Fashion Diva Starz" that fall. Similar to the Mini Diva Starz, these dolls would talk when a button was pressed on top of their heads. Summer was removed from the lineup and replaced by a new character named Miranda, who made her debut in the second wave of Mini Diva Starz.

The "Fashion Diva Starz" dolls failed to find the same commercial success the original dolls had, and only three waves were ever produced. The line in general would end up being discontinued by Mattel in 2004, due to its decrease in popularity and failure to compete with other fashion dolls on the market at the time. Mattel went on to improve the Barbie line and create My Scene and Flavas dolls as attempts to compete with Bratz.

Characters
Alexa (Alexia in Latin America) is an all-out fashionista and natural leader with fair skin, blonde hair, and blue eyes. She also identified herself as "your personal expert on style". She also kept a diary, where she stored her deepest and darkest secrets. Her representation color was pink, which was also her favorite color. She had a pet cat named Fluffy. Alexa is voiced by Debi Derryberry.

Nikki (Paige or Flo in parts of Europe) is a Latina, with tanned skin, brown hair, and light violet eyes. She's an athletic yet optimistic girl "who'd enjoy skateboarding and many other sports." Besides the skateboard she kept, she also owned other sports gear and merchandise. Her representation color was purple, which was also her favorite color. She had a pet dog named Budster (nicknamed "Buddy"). Nikki is voiced by Joanna Rubiner.

Summer (Rosy in Latin America) is a model citizen with pale skin, red hair, and green eyes who "loved the outdoors so much that she'd bring it inside." She was an animal lover and a compassionate environmentalist. She owned many pets, including a pet rabbit named Sunny. Her representation color was green, which was also her favorite color. She was dropped from the line in 2002 and was eventually replaced by Miranda. Summer is voiced by Amber Hood.

Tia is a "hip-cool chick and a techno whiz" with dark skin, dark brown hair, and brown eyes. She was intelligent and inventive and enjoyed making music. She also loved electronics, such as radios, CD players, and digital planners. Her representation color was blue, which was also her favorite color. She had a pet dog named Hippy (short for "Hipster"). Tia was voiced by MC Lyte (2000-02) and later, by Cree Summer (2003).

Miranda is a properly rich girl with pale skin, platinum blonde hair with pink highlights, and green eyes who "loves all her new friends." She is artistic and humorous, with dreams of becoming a pop star. She had also published a fashion magazine. She was introduced in the 2nd wave of "Mini Diva Starz" in 2002, where she ultimately took Summer's place. Her representation color was undefined, but the website showed a green star with her name on it. She is the only character who does not own a pet. Miranda is voiced by Tara Strong.

Product list

Original Dolls 

2000
 "Wave 1": Alexa, Nikki, Summer and Tia.

2001
 "Wave 2": Alexa, Nikki, Summer and Tia.

Mini Diva Starz 

2001
 "Mini Diva Starz" (1st Edition): Alexa, Nikki, Summer and Tia.

2002
 "Mini Diva Starz" (2nd Edition): Alexa, Nikki, Tia and Miranda (first appearance).
 "Mini Diva Starz" (3rd Edition, Target Exclusive): Alexa, Nikki and Summer (last appearance).

Fashion Diva Starz 

2002
 "Fashion Diva Starz" (1st Edition): Alexa, Nikki, Tia and Miranda.
 "Fashion Glow": Alexa, Nikki, Tia and Miranda.

2003
 "Glitter 2 Glam": Alexa, Nikki, Tia and Miranda.

Plush Dolls 

2001
 "Wave 1": Alexa, Nikki, Summer and Tia.
 "Wave 2": Alexa, Nikki and Summer.

Diva Petz 

2001
 "Diva Petz": Fluffy Starz, Budster Starz, Sunny Starz and Hippy Starz
 "Interactive Diva Petz": Fluffy Starz and Budster Starz.

Fashionz 

2000
 "Fashionz" (1st Edition): Alexa, Nikki, Summer and Tia.

2001
 "Fashionz" (2nd Edition): Alexa, Nikki, Summer and Tia.

2002
 "Fashion Diva Starz Fashionz": 56733, 56734, 56735 and 56736.
 "Fashion Glow Fashionz": B1341, B1342, B1343 and B1344.

2003
 "Glitter 2 Glam Fashionz": B3015 and B3016.

Playsets 

2001
 "Mini Diva Starz (1st Edition)":
 "Scooter-iffic" (Pink)
 "Scooter-iffic" (Purple)
 "Scooter-iffic" (Green)

2002
 "Mini Diva Starz (2nd Edition)":
 "Diva Cruiser"

Keychains 

2002
 "Keychains": Alexa, Nikki, Summer and Tia.

Video Games 

2000
 "Diva Starz" (PC)

2001
 "Diva Starz: Mall Mania" (GBC)

References

Fashion dolls
Mattel
2000s toys
Products introduced in 2000